Philip John Talbot Martin (1931–2005) was an Australian academic, poet, translator, critic and broadcaster.

Born in the Melbourne suburb of Richmond, Martin graduated from the University of Melbourne in 1958. He taught English at Monash University from 1964. His poems have been published, anthologised and broadcast both in Australia and overseas.

His poetic output was cut short when he suffered a severe stroke in 1987. He lived through a long period of illness from that time until his death in 2005.

An obituary of Philip Martin written by the Australian poet Kate Llewellyn was published in the Poet's Union magazine Five Bells in its Summer 2005-2006 edition.

Publications
 Voice Unaccompanied: poems (1970)
 Shakespeare's Sonnets: Self, Love and Art (1972)
 A Bone Flute (poems, Australian National University Press, 1974)
 From Sweden: Translations and Poems (1979)
 A Flag for the Wind (poems, Longman Cheshire, 1982)
 New and Selected Poems (poems, Longman Cheshire, 1988)

References

1931 births
2005 deaths
20th-century Australian poets
Australian male poets
20th-century Australian male writers
Australian literary critics
People educated at Xavier College
University of Melbourne alumni
Academic staff of the University of Melbourne
Academic staff of Monash University
Academic staff of the Australian National University
Australian translators
Swedish–English translators
20th-century translators